The 1978 Southwest Conference men's basketball tournament was held March 2–4, 1978, at The Summit in Houston, Texas. The first round took place on February 25 at the higher-seeded campus sites.

Number 3 seed  defeated 1 seed Texas 92–90 to win their 1st championship and receive the conference's automatic bid to the 1978 NCAA tournament.

Format and seeding 
The tournament consisted of 9 teams, seeds 2-8 played in an 8 team single-elimination tournament with the winner playing the top seeded team in the tournament final.

Tournament

Final

References 

1977–78 Southwest Conference men's basketball season
Basketball in Houston
Southwest Conference men's basketball tournament